The 1653 East Smyrna earthquake occurred on 23 February, with an estimated magnitude of 6.72±0.3  and a maximum felt intensity of X (Extreme) on the Mercalli intensity scale.

The event was particularly devastating because it triggered a tsunami, which caused additional destruction and casualties along the coastline. The earthquake and its aftermath were documented in historical records and have been studied by modern seismologists to better understand the seismic activity in the region.

See also
 List of earthquakes in Turkey
 List of historical earthquakes

References

1653 East
1653 earthquakes
1650s in the Ottoman Empire
1653
1653 in Asia